Cochemiea conoidea, common name Texas cone cactus or Chihuahuan beehive, is a species of cactus native to western Texas and to the Mexican states of Coahuila, Durango, Nuevo León, San Luis Potosí, Tamaulipas, and Zacatecas. It is a part of the Chihuahuan Desert desert scrub and the Tamaulipan thorn scrub.

Cochemiea conoidea is an unbranched cylindrical cactus up to 24 cm (9.6 inches) tall and up to 8 cm (3.2 inches) in diameter. Outer tepals of the flowers are whitish with green midveins; inner tepals bright pink-rose to magenta. Fruits are pale yellow-olive with black seeds.

References

conoidea
Flora of Coahuila
Flora of Durango
Flora of Nuevo León
Flora of San Luis Potosí
Flora of Texas
Flora of Tamaulipas
Flora of Zacatecas